Enthira Kaalai is a sculpture created by students of the Society Of Mechanical Engineers and Department of Mechanical Engineering at Nandha Engineering College in Tamil Nadu, India. It was inspired by Tamil Nadu culture and the Jallikattu festival. The sculpture was assembled from scrap materials including bike sprockets, gears, spark plug, chain, sheet metal, wire spring, bearing, nut-bolts, pistons, connecting rods and mild steel pipe. The skeleton of the structure was built with mild steel square rods and flat sheet metal. Gears, sprockets and chains were then fixed over the skeleton. The net weight of Enthira Kaalai is around 275 kg. It took around 14 days to complete.

References

Sculptures in India
Metal sculptures